Martian Through Georgia is a 1962 Warner Bros. Looney Tunes cartoon, directed by Chuck Jones, Maurice Noble (credited as a co-director), and Abe Levitow. The short was released on December 29, 1962.

It is a "one-off" tale about a sad and bored Martian who travels to Earth in search of happiness. He lands his spaceship in the state of Georgia, hence the title. Once there, he decides he must impart his knowledge upon Earthlings; indeed he believes this will bring him happiness. However, the people of Earth panic from the minute he lands, perceiving him as a monster. Ultimately, he realizes that he does not belong and returns home.  The title is a pun on the song Marching Through Georgia.

Plot
The narrator, who speaks throughout the entire cartoon, opens the story by talking about a planet far off in space. On this planet, there is a race of Martians who are advanced and have happiness all throughout their lives, except for one Martian who is fed up with his homeworld's perfect society. Levitating in the air, passing through solid objects, and projecting images from his blue antenna do nothing but bore him. When an attractive female Martian offers to pitch some love to the Martian, he just turns her away, causing her to melt.

The Martian then goes to see a psychiatrist, who recommends that he must travel to another world to cure his boredom. The Martian leaves the planet in a flying saucer that is launched by slingshot and sent deep into space. After some time (including punching a leaking hole in the Big Dipper), he enters the Earth's Solar System and stops at Earth. Observing typical urban scenery and activities of the people on Earth (television antennas, people with huge and little cars, children watching Cowboys and Indians on TV, and teenagers dancing to jukebox tunes), the Martian decides he likes this planet and to land there, so he can bestow the people of Earth with his planet's superior culture.

As the Martian's flying saucer lands in Atlanta, Georgia, a crowd of people gather round the ship, and seeing the Martian, they run away screaming "Monster!" The Martian is confused about the monster everybody is talking about and gets arrested by the police for landing in a "no parking" zone. After he gets questioned by the authorities he is put in a jail cell, but the Martian leaves the cell by passing through the walls, causing the prison guard to cry out for his mother while he sounds the escape whistle.

The next morning, a tall man and a short man are reading the newspapers about the Martian's escape. The tall man makes a comment about the Martian based on the newspaper's description ("Terrible thing, this raving alien monster, roaming the countryside, devouring innocent people, striking terror into the hearts of millions, and leaving behind a trail of chaos and destruction") to which the short man scolds "If you can't say anything nice about someone, you shouldn't say anything at all." As the tall man walks away, the Martian goes up to the short man and hugs him, causing the short man to turn white with fright and call the Martian exactly the same description the tall man gave before fleeing in terror.

Still confused about the "monster", the Martian vows to seek out and destroy it. As the Martian passes a construction site, he spots a steam shovel at work. Assuming that this is the monster everybody is talking about, he whips out a ray gun labeled as an ACME Atom Rearranger, and shoots the steam shovel, turning it into a dragon that licks the now white with fright construction worker that was operating it, and waddles off with him on its back. Satisfied that the "monster" has been destroyed, the Martian walks off confidently, eager to do more good deeds for Earth.

As the Martian passes a red-haired boy reading a comic book, the boy says "Hello, monster" directly at the Martian. Confused as to what the boy just said, the Martian asks the boy if he really called him "monster", to which the boy nods, showing him something that he had found in his comic book: a page with a picture of the Martian that informs the reader that a space monster has no nose, which the Martian indeed does not have. The Martian gets the idea to remove his antenna and put it on his face to pass it off as a nose, but the boy leaves and says "Goodbye, monster."

Now realizing he is the monster, the Martian sinks back into depression and runs through a nightmarish landscape, a dark voice all around him calling him "monster" and berating him to go home. Just as the Martian ducks into an alley, the narrator recommends that the Martian could just commit suicide, since nobody loves him. The Martian takes out his ray gun and prepares to blow his brains out, when the narrator helps him remember that somebody does love him. Taking this advice to heart, the Martian puts his antenna back in place on his head and remembers the female Martian he had turned down earlier. As the narrator says someday, a new constellation will appear, the Martian, now wanting to seek happiness back on his home planet, blasts off back home, which is seen as a star in a constellation of stars that form a heart. The narrator concludes the story by saying that when this new constellation does appear, no one will ever be bored on the Martian's planet.

Home media
Martian Through Georgia is available, uncensored and uncut, on ''Looney Tunes Golden Collection, Volume 6'', Disc 4.

References

External links
 

1962 films
1962 animated films
1962 short films
1960s science fiction films
Fictional Martians
Animated films about extraterrestrial life
Films directed by Abe Levitow
Short films directed by Chuck Jones
Films directed by Maurice Noble
Films set in Atlanta
Looney Tunes shorts
Warner Bros. Cartoons animated short films
Films scored by William Lava
American animated science fiction films
1960s Warner Bros. animated short films
1960s English-language films
Alien visitations in films